From January 29 to June 4, 1996, voters of the Democratic Party chose its nominee for president in the 1996 United States presidential election. Incumbent President Bill Clinton was again selected as the nominee through a series of primary elections and caucuses culminating in the 1996 Democratic National Convention held from August 26 to August 29, 1996, in Chicago, Illinois.

Primary race overview
With the advantage of incumbency, Bill Clinton's path to renomination by the Democratic Party was uneventful. At the 1996 Democratic National Convention, Clinton - along with incumbent Vice President Al Gore - was renominated following a primary race in which he faced only token opposition. Perennial candidate Lyndon LaRouche qualified for one delegate from Virginia and one delegate from Louisiana, but the state parties refused to award him delegates and the First District Court of Appeals upheld their decision. Former Pennsylvania governor Bob Casey contemplated a challenge to Clinton, but health problems forced Casey to abandon a bid. That left Jimmy Griffin, the former mayor of Buffalo, New York, as the highest-ranking challenger still in the race. After finishing in eighth place, behind even the perennial candidates, in the New Hampshire primaries, Griffin dropped out of the race. Clinton easily won primaries nationwide, with margins consistently higher than 80%.

Roland Riemers scored a victory in North Dakota, a state where Clinton did not file to appear on the ballot.

Backed by a loyal following, LaRouche managed to get on the ballot in most states and amassed over half a million votes nationwide in the primary. His highest percentage was 13.4% in West Virginia and received over a hundred thousand votes in California.

Another notable campaign besides LaRouche's to challenge President Clinton was Chicago housewife Elvena Lloyd-Duffie, who was reported to have outraised him at one point and got as high as 11% of the vote in Oklahoma. and 7% in Louisiana.

Candidates

Nominee

Withdrew during primaries
Activist Lyndon LaRouche from Virginia
Former Mayor of Buffalo Jimmy Griffin from New York

Results
With a number of non-notable people running against Clinton and LaRouche in several states, The nationwide totals went as follows:

† Indicates a write-in candidate

See also
1996 Republican Party presidential primaries

References